Walter Dietrich (24 December 1902 – 27 November 1979) was a Swiss footballer who started his active career by FC Basel. Via Forward Morges he moved to Servette and finally in the summer of 1925 to Eintracht Frankfurt and here he ended his active football ten years later. He played as forward.

Career
Dietrich joined Basel's first team in their 1919–20 season, but played only six test matches. He played his domestic league debut for the club in the first game of the next season, the away game on 26 September 1920 as Basel were defeated 1–4 by Young Boys. He scored his first goal for his club a week later on 3 October in the home game at the Landhof against Aarau as the two teams played a 2–2 draw.

Between the years 1919 and 1922 Dietrich played a total of 34 games for Basel scoring a total of five goals. Eight of these games were in the Swiss Serie A and 26 were friendly games. He scored one goal in the domestic league, the other four were scored during test games.

After playing one season for Forward Morges and two seasons for Servette he moved to Eintracht Frankfurt in 1925. Eintracht played in the Bezirksliga Main the highest association football league in the German state of Hesse and the Prussian province of Hesse-Nassau. Dietrich played ten seasons for Eintracht playing 208 league matches and scoring 66 goals.

Dietrich played 14 games for the Swiss national team. He was a member of the Swiss team, which won the silver medal in the football tournament at the 1924 Summer Olympics.

After his career Dietrich opened up an architecture firm. In 1937 when a stand of the first version of Riederwaldstadion burned down Dietrich's firm was pivotal in the reconstruction. In 1938 he returned to Switzerland and shortly took over his hometown club FC Basel that had just been relegated to the second tier.

Honours 

Switzerland
 Olympic Games
 Silver: Summer Olympics 1924

Servette FC
 Swiss Serie A:
 Champion: 1924–25

Eintracht Frankfurt
 Bezirksliga Main-Hessen:
 Champion: 1927–28, 1928–29, 1929–30, 1930–31, 1931–32
 Runner-up: 1932–33
 Southern German Championship
 Champion: 1929–30, 1931–32
 Runner-up: 1927–28, 1930–31
 German Championship
 Runner-up: 1932
 Gauliga Südwest/Mainhessen:
 Champion: 1937–38
 Runner-up: 1936–37

References

Sources
 Rotblau: Jahrbuch Saison 2017/2018. Publisher: FC Basel Marketing AG. 
 Die ersten 125 Jahre. Publisher: Josef Zindel im Friedrich Reinhardt Verlag, Basel. 
 Verein "Basler Fussballarchiv" Homepage

External links 
 Walter Dietrich at eintracht-archiv.de
 DatabaseOlympics.com profile
 

1902 births
1979 deaths
Swiss men's footballers
Switzerland international footballers
Footballers at the 1924 Summer Olympics
Footballers at the 1928 Summer Olympics
Olympic footballers of Switzerland
Olympic silver medalists for Switzerland
FC Basel players
Servette FC players
Eintracht Frankfurt players
Eintracht Frankfurt managers
FC Basel managers
Olympic medalists in football
Medalists at the 1924 Summer Olympics
Swiss football managers
Association football forwards